The 1950 Bolivian Primera División, the first division of Bolivian football (soccer), was played by 9 teams. The champion was Bolívar. It was the first season after the La Paz Football Association turned its first division professional.
All 9 teams were from La Paz and played their matches on the Hernando Siles Stadium

Torneo Interdepartamental

Standings

Title play-off

References

External links
 Official website of the LFPB 

Bolivian Primera División seasons
Bolivia
1950 in Bolivian sport